Psebiini is a tribe of beetles in the subfamily Cerambycinae, containing the following genera:

 Genus Australopsebium Bjørnstad, 2016
 Genus Bostrychopsebium Quentin & Villiers, 1971
 Genus Bottegia Gestro, 1895
 Genus Capepsebium Adlbauer, 2000
 Genus Chorothyse Pascoe, 1867
 Genus Cleptopsebium Quentin & Villiers, 1971
 Genus Dodecocerus Dalens & Touroult, 2008
 Dodecocerus poirieri Dalens & Touroult, 2008
 Genus Duffyia Quentin & Villiers, 1971
 Genus Frondipedia Martins & Napp, 1984
 Frondipedia charma Martins & Napp, 1984
 Genus Haplopsebium Aurivillius, 1891
 Genus Hovorea Chemsak & Noguera, 1993
 Hovorea chica Chemsak & Noguera, 1993
 Genus Idiopsebium Quentin & Villiers, 1971
 Genus Kabatekiipsebium Rapuzzi, 2015
 Genus Macropsebium Bates, 1878
 Genus Malayopsebium Niisato, 2016
 Genus Mourgliana Holzschuh, 1993
 Genus Nathriobrium Hovore, 1980
 Nathriobrium methioides Hovore, 1980
 Genus Nathrius Brèthes, 1916
 Genus Nesopsebium Fairmaire, 1894
 Genus Paraleptidea Gounelle, 1913
 Paraleptidea femorata Gounelle, 1913
 Paraleptidea longitarsis (Lane, 1951)
 Paraleptidea sanmartini (Zajciw, 1960)
 Genus Pectinocallimus Niisato, 1989
 Pectinocallimus sericeus Niisato, 1989
 Genus Pectinopsebium Adlbauer & Bjørnstad, 2012
 Genus Pembius Quentin & Villiers, 1971
 Genus Plectopsebium Boppe, 1915
 Genus Psebium Pascoe, 1864
 Genus Pseudobottegia Duffy, 1955

References

Cerambycinae